The Remedy is Kurt Rosenwinkel's seventh album as a leader. It is a 2-disc album recorded live at the Village Vanguard in January 2006. All songs were written by Rosenwinkel except "Myrons World," which was written by Mark Turner. All of the tracks feature the band taking extended solos. This 2-disc album is the first release to appear on Kurt Rosenwinkel's own WOMMUSIC (Word of Mouth Music); it was originally distributed by ArtistShare.

Track listing 
Disc 1
Chords — 16:21
The Remedy — 11:37
Flute — 14:23
A Life Unfolds — 17:54

Disc 2
View From Moscow — 12:51
Terra Nova — 11:42
Safe Corners — 17:10
Myrons World — 19:13

Personnel
Kurt Rosenwinkel — Guitar
Mark Turner — Tenor Saxophone
Aaron Goldberg —Piano
Joe Martin — Bass
Eric Harland — Drums

References

2008 live albums
Kurt Rosenwinkel albums
Albums recorded at the Village Vanguard